Paul Biya (born Paul Barthélemy Biya'a bi Mvondo; 13 February 1933) is a Cameroonian politician who has served as the president of Cameroon since 6 November 1982. He is the second-longest-ruling president in Africa, the longest consecutively serving current non-royal national leader in the world and the oldest head of state in the world. 

A native of Cameroon's south, Biya rose rapidly as a bureaucrat under President Ahmadou Ahidjo in the 1960s, serving as Secretary-General of the Presidency from 1968 to 1975 and then Prime Minister of Cameroon from 1975 to 1982. He succeeded Ahidjo as president upon the latter's surprise resignation in 1982 and consolidated power in a 1983–1984 staged attempted coup in which he eliminated all of his major rivals.

Biya introduced political reforms within the context of a one-party system in the 1980s, later accepting the introduction of multiparty politics in the early 1990s under serious pressure. He won the contentious 1992 presidential election with 40% of the plural, single-ballot vote and was re-elected by large margins in 1997, 2004, 2011, and 2018. Opposition politicians and Western governments have alleged voting irregularities and fraud on each of these occasions. Many independent sources have provided evidence that he did not win the elections in 1992 and that subsequent elections suffered from rampant  fraud.

His regime is supported by France, one of the former colonial powers in Cameroon, which supplies it with weapons and trains its military forces. France is also the leading foreign investor in Cameroon, ahead of the United States.

Early life and education
Paul Biya was born in the village of Mvomeka'a in what is now the South Region of Cameroon. He studied at the Lycée General Leclerc, Yaoundé, and in France at the Lycée Louis-le-Grand, Paris, going on to the Institut des hautes études d'Outre-Mer, where he graduated in 1961 with a higher education diploma in public law.

Political career
As an official in post-independence 1960s Cameroon, Biya rose to prominence under President Ahmadou Ahidjo. After becoming director of the Cabinet of the minister of national education in January 1964 and secretary-general of the ministry of national education in July 1965, he was named director of the civil cabinet of the president in December 1967 and secretary-general of the presidency (while remaining director of the civil cabinet) in January 1968. He gained the rank of minister in August 1968 and the rank of minister of state in June 1970, while remaining secretary-general of the presidency. Following the creation of a unitary state in 1972, he became Prime Minister of Cameroon on 30 June 1975. In June 1979, a new law designated the prime minister as the president's constitutional successor. Ahidjo unexpectedly announced his resignation on 4 November 1982, and Biya accordingly succeeded him as president of Cameroon on 6 November.

Because Biya is a Christian from the southern region of Cameroon, it was considered surprising that he was chosen by Ahidjo, a Muslim from the north, as his successor. His father, who was a catechist, wanted him to join the clergy, but at the age of 16 while in Catholic school, he was expelled. After Biya became President, Ahidjo initially remained head of the ruling Cameroon National Union (CNU). Biya was brought into the CNU Central Committee and Political Bureau and was elected as the Vice-President of the CNU. On 11 December 1982, he was placed in charge of managing party affairs in Ahidjo's absence. During the first months after Biya's succession, he continued to show loyalty to Ahidjo, and Ahidjo continued to show support for Biya, but in 1983 a deep rift developed between the two. Ahidjo went into exile in France, and from there he publicly accused Biya of abuse of power and paranoia about plots against him. After Ahidjo resigned as CNU leader, Biya took the helm of the party at an "extraordinary session" of the CNU party held on 14 September 1983.

In November 1983, Biya announced that the next presidential election would be held on 14 January 1984; it had been previously scheduled for 1985. He was the sole candidate in this election and won 99.98% of the vote. In February 1984, Ahidjo was put on trial in absentia for alleged involvement in a 1983 coup plot, along with two others; they were sentenced to death, although Biya commuted their sentences to life in prison. Biya survived a military coup attempt on 6 April 1984, following his decision on the previous day to disband the Republican Guard and disperse its members across the military. Estimates of the death toll ranged from 71 (according to the government) to about 1,000. Northern Muslims were the primary participants in this coup attempt, which was seen by many as an attempt to restore that group's supremacy; Biya, however, chose to emphasize national unity and did not focus blame on northern Muslims. Ahidjo was widely believed to have orchestrated the coup attempt, and Biya is thought to have learned of the plot in advance and to have disbanded the Republican Guard in response, forcing the coup plotters to act earlier than they had planned, which may have been a crucial factor in the coup's failure.Under his rule, the country adopted a structural adjustment plan submitted to it by the International Monetary Fund (IMF) and World Bank, which involved privatization, opening up to competition, and reducing social spending. Civil servants' salaries were reduced by 60%, and the informal sector increased very significantly.

In 1985, the CNU was transformed into the Cameroon People's Democratic Movement, in Bamenda and Biya was unlawfully elected as its president. He was also re-elected as President of Cameroon on 24 April 1988.
Biya initially took some steps to open up the regime, culminating in the decision to legalize opposition parties in 1990. According to official results, Biya won the first multiparty presidential election, held on 11 October 1992, with about 40% of the vote. There was no provision for a runoff; the opposition was unable to unite around a single candidate. The second placed candidate, John Fru Ndi of the opposition Social Democratic Front (SDF), officially received about 36%. The results were strongly disputed by the opposition, which alleged fraud.

In the October 1997 presidential election, which was boycotted by the main opposition parties, Biya was re-elected with 92.6 percent of the vote; he was sworn in on 3 November.

He has been consistently re-elected as the National President of the RDPC; he was re-elected at the party's second extraordinary congress on 7 July 2001 and its third extraordinary congress on 21 July 2006.

Biya won another seven-year term in the 11 October 2004 presidential election, officially taking 70.92 percent of the vote, although the opposition again alleged widespread fraud. Biya was sworn in on 3 November.

After being re-elected in 2004, Biya was barred by a two-term limit in the 1996 Constitution from running for President again in 2011, but he sought to revise this, to allow him to run again. In his 2008 New Year's message, Biya expressed support for revising the Constitution, saying that it was undemocratic to limit the people's choice. The proposed removal of term limits was among the grievances expressed during violent protests in late February 2008. Nevertheless, on 10 April 2008, the National Assembly voted to change the Constitution to remove term limits. Given the RDPC's control of the National Assembly, the change was overwhelmingly approved, with 157 votes in favor and five opposed; the 15 deputies of the SDF chose to boycott the vote in protest. The change also provided for the President to enjoy immunity from prosecution for his actions as President after leaving office.
On 12 June 2006, he signed the Greentree Agreement with Nigerian President Olusegun Obasanjo which formally put an end to the Bakassi peninsula border dispute.

In February 2008, riots broke out, calling for lower prices and the departure of Paul Biya as president. The demonstrators were severely repressed with reports of a hundred dead and thousands of arrests.

In the October 2011 presidential election, Biya secured a sixth term in office, polling 77.9% of votes cast. John Fru Ndi was his nearest rival, polling 10%. Biya's opponents alleged wide-scale fraud in the election and procedural irregularities were noted by the French and US governments. In his victory speech, Biya promised to stimulate growth and create jobs with a programme of public works which would "transform our country into a vast construction site". On 3 November 2011, he was sworn in for another term as President.

Biya won the 2018 presidential election with 71.3% of the vote. The election was marred by violence and low voter turnout.
As of 2022, he is the longest serving non-royal head of state, having been in power since June 30, 1975.

Opposition and criticism

Biya makes relatively few public appearances, and is sometimes characterized as aloof. Since the early 1990s, he has faced his strongest opposition from the Anglophone population of the former Southern Cameroons in the western part of the country.

Although Biya made some efforts to open up the political environment, his regime still retains clear authoritarian characteristics and has largely bucked the trend toward democracy in Africa since the 1990s. Under the constitution, Biya has sweeping executive and legislative powers. He even has considerable authority over the judiciary; the courts can only review a law's constitutionality at his request. The RDPC continues to dominate the National Assembly, which does little more than approve his policies.

"Tyrants, the World's 20 Worst Living Dictators", by David Wallechinsky, ranked Biya together with three other leaders in sub-Saharan Africa: Robert Mugabe of Zimbabwe, Teodoro Obiang Nguema Mbasogo of Equatorial Guinea, and King Mswati of Swaziland (now Eswatini). He describes Cameroon's electoral process in these terms: "Every few years, Biya stages an election to justify his continuing reign, but these elections have no credibility. In fact, Biya is credited with a creative innovation in the world of phony elections. In 2004, annoyed by the criticisms of international vote-monitoring groups, he paid for his own set of international observers, six ex-U.S. congressmen, who certified his election as free and fair." In a 2005 interview William Quantrill, a retired member of the British Diplomatic Service, argued that the reluctance of Biya to delegate responsibility seriously hampered the quality of governance, with trivial decisions often delayed until he got round to delivering them, and that there was too much government interference in the economy in general.

Biya regularly spends extended periods of time in Switzerland at the Hotel InterContinental Geneva where the former director Herbert Schott reportedly said he comes to work without being disturbed. These extended stays away from Cameroon – while sometimes as short as two weeks and sometimes as long as three months – are almost always referred to as "short stays" in the state-owned press and other media. In February 2008, he passed a bill that allows for having an additional term in office as president which was followed by civil unrests throughout the country. The main violent riots took place in the Western, English-speaking part of the country starting with a "strike" initiated by taxi drivers in Douala, allegedly causing more than 200 casualties in the end. In 2009, his holiday in France allegedly cost $40,000 a day spent on 43 hotel rooms.In 2009, Biya was ranked 19th in Parade Magazine's Top 20 list of "The World's Worst Dictators".

In November 2010, Bertrand Teyou published a book titled La belle de la république bananière: Chantal Biya, de la rue au palais (English: "The beauty of the banana republic: Chantal Biya, from the streets to the palace"), tracing Chantal Biya's rise from humble origins to become Paul Biya's First Lady. He was subsequently given a two-year prison term on charges of "insult to character" and organizing an "illegal demonstration" for attempting to hold a public reading. Amnesty International and International PEN's Writers in Prison Committee both protested his arrest and issued appeals on his behalf; Amnesty International also named him a prisoner of conscience. He was freed on 2 May 2011 when the London chapter of International PEN agreed to pay his fine in order that he might seek treatment for his worsening health condition.

In February 2014, French citizen Michel Thierry Atangana was released from a makeshift Yaoundé prison where, under Biya's orders, he had been arbitrarily detained for 17 years under false claims of embezzlement because of supposed closeness to presidential candidate Titus Edzoa. Considered a political prisoner and prisoner of conscience by the United States Department of State, Amnesty International, Freedom House, and the U.N. Working Group on Arbitrary Detention since 2005, Michel was released under Biya's personal decree but the Working Group's tripartite demands remain unfulfilled.

In 2016, Cameroonians in the nation's capital city of Yaoundé criticized Biya's reaction to the country's worst train crash in which 79 people died. Critics included government officials who remained anonymous, fearing a backlash.
The Anglophone protests in late 2016 were led by English-speaking lawyers in protest against the use of French in Cameroonian courts, which led to violent clashes with police. Opposition party leader Edna Njilin of the Cameroon People's Party spoke out against the enforced use of French in the classroom. In January 2017, the government ordered a suspension of Internet services in the Northwest and Southwest provinces. Criticism of the suspension and increased opposition led to resumption of services in late April.

By June 2017, protests in Cameroon's English-speaking provinces and cities led to police responding with force, with four protesters killed and more than 100 arrested. International criticism has been levied at the United States for their lack of response to the growing Cameroonian crisis.

In April 2017, a Cameroonian journalist working for Radio France Internationale, Ahmed Abba, was sentenced to 10 years' imprisonment by a military tribunal for failing to report acts of terrorism. The judgement was severely criticized by human rights groups including Amnesty International.

On 7 November 2018, another Cameroonian journalist, Mimi Mefo, was arrested after reporting on social media that the Cameroonian military was behind the murder of an American missionary in the country, Charles Trumann, in October of that year. Mefo was charged with "publishing and propagating information that infringes on the territorial integrity of the Republic of Cameroon," but was released and charges were dropped on 12 November after her arrest was condemned by both local and international media groups.

Anglophone Cameroon 

During 2016 and 2017, under Paul Biya's reign, large scale protests broke out among Anglophone Cameroonians in the area of the formerly British Southern Cameroons. Protestors complained that Anglophone regions in Cameroon (the Northwest Region and the Southwest Region) were neglected by Biya's government, and excluded from power. During this time, Anglophone separatists claim that government forces murdered protestors en masse, and committed crimes against humanity, including genocide. Certain protestors had called upon Biya and the Cameroonian government to grant them independence.

Eventually, separatists declared independence in October 2017 under the name Ambazonia. Numerous civilians and activists have accused Biya's government forces of burning villages, raping women, extrajudicial killings of civilians, and acts of genocide. A petition to the United Nations gave details of police raping students at a university. The National Commission for Human Rights and Freedoms embarked on a fact-finding mission in Buea to investigate allegations of human rights abuses in the region.

A June 2018 report by the BBC News found a widespread pattern of villages throughout the Southwest Region being burnt, including one video of men wearing government-issued BIR (Bataillon d'Intervention Rapide) equipment. The BIR is a special force body that reports directly to President Biya. The report also included a video of a man being tortured by men appearing to be Cameroonian gendarmes. Biya's Minister of Communication, Issa Tchiroma, responded by stating that anyone can use government equipment to commit false flag attacks, and said that Biya's government would investigate.

Individual sources testify that all of those sent to fight the secessionist militia are French speaking, thus widening the linguistic division between local residents.

On 14 November 2019, Cameroon’s president, Paul Biya admitted in a Paris forum of trying to assimilate former British Southern Cameroons into the majority Francophone system, formerly East Cameroon State but failed, due to identity differences, thus triggering the Ambazonia War of independence in 2017.

Personal life 
Biya became a naturalized citizen of France when he studied there, but he later relinquished his French citizenship when he returned to Cameroon to serve in government positions. In 1961, he married Jeanne-Irène Biya, who did not have any children, though she adopted Franck Biya, who had been born previously from a relationship between Paul Biya and another woman. After Jeanne-Irène Biya died on 29 July 1992, Paul Biya married Chantal Biya, who is 36 years younger, on 23 April 1994, and had two more children with her.

Notes

External links

World Statesmen – Cameroon

|-

|-

Biya, Paul
Cameroon People's Democratic Movement politicians
Cameroonian Roman Catholics
Living people
People from South Region (Cameroon)
Presidents of Cameroon
Prime Ministers of Cameroon
Sciences Po alumni
Grand Crosses Special Class of the Order of Merit of the Federal Republic of Germany